Aristida anaclasta is a species of grass in the family Poaceae. It is found only in Yemen.

References

anaclasta
Endemic flora of Socotra
Data deficient plants
Taxonomy articles created by Polbot